Access is a British entertainment news television programme created by Channel 5 which airs over their own networks which include Channel 5, 5Select, 5Star, 5USA and Paramount Network.

History
Access was previously two different shows, 5* Access and a show about Hollywood, but the two were combined to create the new format of Access in 2015.

In 2021, the programme was replaced with Entertainment News on 5, a similar show to Access but with branding similar to Channel 5's own branding.

Format
Access features news and gossip about showbiz, celebrities, pop culture, and also information and trailers for movies. Access airs throughout the day starting from 9am each day, it is the first programme to air on 5USA & 5Select. It can run from 5 minutes or alternatively, 30 minutes in some occasions. The theme music for Access was written by UK production company Noise Fusion.

References

2015 British television series debuts
2021 British television series endings
2020s British television series
Channel 5 (British TV channel) original programming
English-language television shows